German Championships or German Championship may refer to:

 Bundesliga (football)
 its predecessor, the German football championship
 Deutsche Rennsport Meisterschaft ("German Racing Championship")
 Deutsche Tourenwagen Meisterschaft ("German Touring Car Championship")
 East German rugby union championship
 German Amateur Championship (snooker)
 German amateur football championship
 German Athletics Championships
 German Bandy Championship
 German Chess Championship
 German Darts Championship
 German Figure Skating Championships
 German Formula Three Championship
 German Ice Hockey Championship
 German Individual Speedway Championship
 German Indoor Athletics Championships
 German Karting Championship
 German rugby union championship
 German Pro Championships (tennis)
 German Skeleton Championship
 German Speedway Championship
 German women's ice hockey Bundesliga
 Super Tourenwagen Cup (or German Supertouring Championship)
 Western German football championship